Samuel Shadap (born 26 November 1992) is an Indian professional footballer who plays as a right back for Delhi FC.

Career
Shadap starting training with Shillong Lajong F.C. at their Academy in 2006. Then before the 2012–13 I-League season began it was officially announced that Shadap had signed his first professional contract with Shillong Lajong after his impressive performance in the North East Super Series during pre-season. He then made his debut for the club on 6 October 2012 against Mohun Bagan in which he came on as a 68th-minute substitute for Renedy Singh as Shillong Lajong won the match 2–0.

Kerala Blasters FC
On 23 July 2017, Shadap was selected in the 12th round of the 2017–18 ISL Players Draft by the Kerala Blasters for the 2017–18 Indian Super League season. He made his debut for the club on 22 December 2017 against Chennaiyin. He came on as a 43rd minute substitute for Rino Anto as Kerala Blasters drew 1–1. Shadap then made his first start for the Kerala Blasters the next game in the absence of Anto against Bengaluru.

Kerala Blasters FC (B)
Shadap's inconsistency in performance had put him in the B-team of Blasters. He played I League 2nd Division with the Kerala Blasters FC(B).

Churchill Brothers SC
Samuel Shadap Currently joined Churchill Brothers S.C. for the 2020–21 I-League.

Career statistics

Club

References

External links 
 
 Indian Super League profile

1992 births
Living people
People from Shillong
Footballers from Meghalaya
I-League players
Indian Super League players
Association football defenders
Indian footballers
Shillong Lajong FC players
Kerala Blasters FC players
Southern Samity players
RoundGlass Punjab FC players
Mohammedan SC (Kolkata) players
Churchill Brothers FC Goa players
Kerala Blasters FC Reserves and Academy players
I-League 2nd Division players